Today (also referred to as The Today Show) is an Australian breakfast television news and current affairs program, with an infotainment base, hosted by Karl Stefanovic and Sarah Abo and includes news and weather updates. It broadcast weekdays on the Nine Network. The show also has a weekend edition called Weekend Today.

Today airs each weekday after Nine News: Early Edition and runs from 5:30 am to 9:00 am before Today Extra, an extended light entertainment program, hosted by David Campbell and Sylvia Jeffreys. The show is broadcast from the Nine Network TCN studios in North Sydney, a suburb located on the North Shore of New South Wales. Although not affiliated with, the program shares a similar infotainment format and title of the long running United States program.

History 

Officially launched as The National Today Show, Today is Australia's longest running morning breakfast news program. The show premiered on 28 June 1982. The original hosts, Steve Liebmann and Sue Kellaway, spent four years together before Liebmann left to present the evening news for Network Ten in Sydney. 
 
Former 60 Minutes reporter George Negus took over the male presenting role, but after four years, Liebmann returned to the Nine Network, hosting Today for a long tenure with co-presenter Liz Hayes and subsequently Tracy Grimshaw. However, in December 2004, Liebmann suffered a mild heart attack, and decided to retire. prompting him to retire from breakfast television.

Karl Stefanovic, a National Nine News reporter replaced Liebmann in 2005, whilst co-host Tracy Grimshaw left Today at the end of 2005 to replace Ray Martin as host of A Current Affair. While it had been widely speculated in the Australian press that Seven News presenter Chris Bath would co-host Today with Stefanovic from January 2006, the position instead went to former Ten News presenter Jessica Rowe. Rowe had mixed beginnings as the co-host of Today with some viewers and commentators criticising her because of her dress-sense and her apparent over-happiness, citing her constant nervous laughter. Following her court case against Network Ten, Rowe was subjected to comments from the media and viewers that she should be sacked and was not right for the role of Today. Rowe's replacements while on maternity leave were Sarah Murdoch and Kellie Sloane, who both saw a significant increases in ratings. They both presented until Rowe's departure from the show, with the Nine Network releasing a press statement on 5 May 2007 stating that Rowe had left the Network to "take up other opportunities for her career".

In May 2007, former Weekend Sunrise co-host Lisa Wilkinson was appointed as Jessica Rowe's successor. In October 2017, Wilkinson resigned effective immediately from the network due to contract negotiations failing. She finished on the show on 16 October 2017. It was later announced that Wilkinson would join Network Ten and The Project as a senior host and editor. Deborah Knight temporarily replaced Wilkinson until Georgie Gardner, who previously regularly appeared on the program as its news presenter, was announced as a permanent replacement host. Gardner commenced hosting Today in January 2018.

In December 2018, it was announced that Karl Stefanovic would not be returning to Today after 14 years as host.

On 5 January 2019, the Nine Network announced that Deborah Knight would join Georgie Gardner as co-host replacing Stefanovic. It was also announced that Tom Steinfort would replace Sylvia Jeffreys as news presenter and Tony Jones would replace Tim Gilbert as sports presenter, whilst Brooke Boney would become entertainment presenter, working alongside Richard Wilkins. The new team began on 14 January 2019. In February 2019 it was announced that Natalia Cooper would not return to the show after her maternity leave, with Steven Jacobs becoming weather presenter once again.

The revamped line-up attracted constant media scrutiny and struggled to attain viewers – at times recording record-low ratings. It has been noted by some commentators however that the viewership gap with Sunrise was actually higher in Wilkinson's first year as co-host in 2007, with the audience building over time to eventually overtake Sunrise. The lower ratings were also attributed to the fact that overall television audiences had decreased in comparison with prior years.

In November 2019, the Nine Network announced that Karl Stefanovic would return to the show as co-host alongside Weekend Today co-host and 60 Minutes reporter Allison Langdon from January 2020. Both Georgie Gardner and Deborah Knight remained with the Nine Network with Gardner leaving the show immediately.

In December 2019, it was announced that Tracy Vo would replace Tom Steinfort as news presenter, Alex Cullen would replace Tony Jones as sports presenter and Tim Davies would replace Steven Jacobs as weather presenter In March 2020, Tracy Vo permanently returned to Perth due to the COVID-19 pandemic. Alex Cullen now presents both news and sport.

On 9 September 2022, Today broke the news of the death of Queen Elizabeth II. Karl Stefanovic and Allison Langdon presented rolling coverage live from the United Kingdom from 4:30 am until 12 midday, when the coverage was taken over by David Campbell and Sylvia Jeffreys. Coverage included live crosses to Tracy Vo and Leila McKinnon, Charles Croucher and Carrie-Anne Greenbank, as well as various interviews with royal commentators including Camilla Tominey and Dickie Arbiter.

In November 2022, the Nine Network announced that 60 Minutes reporter Sarah Abo would replace Allison Langdon from January 2023. Langdon has been appointed as host of A Current Affair replacing Tracy Grimshaw. 

In January 2023, Brooke Boney replaced Alex Cullen as news presenter with Cullen focusing on sport.

Today Extra: 2016–present 

In January 2016, Nine announced that Mornings would be rebranded as Today Extra to become an extension of the network's breakfast show Today. The show was moved to the Today studio, while keeping its focus on light entertainment and news updates.

In January 2019, Campbell was announced the new host of Weekend Today. He will continue to host the program on Monday, Tuesday and Wednesday, with Richard Wilkins joining the show as co-host on Thursday and Friday.

In November 2019, Kruger announced her resignation from the Nine Network, with her last show on Friday 15 November. In December 2019, it was announced that Kruger's temporary replacement Sylvia Jeffreys will replace Kruger permanently upon her return from maternity leave in 2020. It was also announced that Campbell will return to hosting the show each weekday, with Wilkins moving to hosting Weekend Today. Belinda Russell joined the show to host in Jeffreys' absence.

Weekend Today: 2009–present 

In January 2009, David Gyngell, chief executive of the Nine Network, and John Westacott, former head of news and current affairs, announced that Today would begin broadcasting on Sunday mornings. The program, entitled Today on Sunday, competes in the same timeslot as the Seven Network's Weekend Sunrise, which dominates Sunday morning television. The show launched on 1 February 2009 and the original team consisted of Cameron Williams and Leila McKinnon with the news presented by Amber Sherlock and the sport was presented by Tim Gilbert on Saturday and Michael Slater on Sunday.

On 2 May 2009, after the launch of Today on Sunday Australia, the Nine Network announced through a surprise edition that Today on Saturday Australia would return. The program incorporates the same presenting team as the Sunday edition, being the first Australian breakfast news program to broadcast seven days a week. Due to the launch of the Saturday version of the program, the Nine Network renamed the programs as Today: Weekend Edition Australia. David Gyngell said that the launch of the weekend editions were a part of the Nine Network's plans to strengthen its news and current affairs department and return viewers to its once leading service. In July 2009, Today: Weekend Edition Australia was renamed as Weekend Today. In September 2012, Weekend Today was extended to three hours on Saturday.

In September 2014, Deborah Knight permanently replaced Leila McKinnon as co-host of the show; following McKinnon's move to the news department.

In November 2016, Peter Stefanovic announced that he would be moving to 60 Minutes in 2017 as a reporter. Tom Steinfort was announced as Stefanovic's replacement.

In December 2017, Deborah Knight was appointed host of Nine News Sydney on Friday and Saturday nights. She replaced Georgie Gardner who replaced Lisa Wilkinson on Today. It was later announced that 60 Minutes reporter Allison Langdon would replace Knight on Weekend Today. Peter Stefanovic also returned as host replacing Tom Steinfort who will become a reporter on 60 Minutes.

In December 2018, it was announced that Peter Stefanovic had parted ways with the Nine Network to pursue other opportunities. David Campbell was later announced as his replacement.

In January 2019, David Campbell and Allison Langdon are the co-hosts with the news presented by Jayne Azzopardi, sport presented by Clint Stanaway and weather presented by Tim Davies.

In November 2019, the Nine Network announced that Karl Stefanovic would return to Today as co-host alongside Weekend Today co-host and 60 Minutes reporter Allison Langdon from January 2020.

In December 2019, Richard Wilkins and Rebecca Maddern were announced as co-hosts of Weekend Today from January 2020 replacing both David Campbell  and Allison Langdon. Jayne Azzopardi will continue as news presenter, while Lauren Phillips will join the show as weather presenter.

In November 2021, it was announced that Rebecca Maddern had resigned from the Nine Network. Belinda Russell and Charles Croucher will replace Maddern and Jayne Azzopardi will continue to present news. Lauren Phillips also resigned from the show to concentrate on her radio career. Dan Anstey joined the show in 2022 replacing Phillips.

In March 2023, Belinda Russell announced she had left Weekend Today. Her last appearance being 26 February. 

As of March 2023, Clint Stanaway and Jayne Azzopardi are the hosts with Lizzie Pearl presenting news, Richard Wilkins presenting entertainment and Dan Anstey presenting weather.

Today on Saturday: 1992–2002 
After the initial success of Today, a Saturday edition was produced in the early nineties. Hosted by Tracy Grimshaw, it featured more news, politics and economic reports. Tracy Grimshaw was later followed by Tara Brown and Richard Wilkins, before reporter Helen Dalley joined the program in 1996. These hosts were accompanied by news presenters Michael Usher, Anna Coren and Mark Burrows. In 2002, Today on Saturday Australia was cancelled due to budget cuts by the Nine Network.

Anniversaries and reunions
Today celebrated its 25th anniversary, on 28 June 2007, by travelling to five different Australian cities in one week, something which had never been before attempted by an Australian television show. Former Today hosts and musical guests were involved.

On the official day marking the 25th anniversary, former hosts who made an appearance included Ian Ross, Tracy Grimshaw, Monte Dwyer, Liz Hayes and Helen Dalley. Sami Lukis, who replaced Monte Dwyer, did not appear, nor did original co-host Sue Kellaway. Original co-host Steve Liebmann was also unable to attend, nor was current weather presenter Steven Jacobs, however video messages from both were aired.

Today celebrated its 30th anniversary in 2012. The show began the year by unveiling a new set, logo and graphics.

In September, Today held a week-long celebration which included flashbacks from earlier episodes and live appearances by former hosts such as Steve Liebmann and Sue Kellaway with Tracy Grimshaw, Monte Dwyer and Sarah Murdoch. Liz Hayes was unable to join the show due to being on assignment with 60 Minutes but shared her memories in a prerecorded message. Video messages were also left by Brian Bury, George Negus and Joan McInnes

Today celebrated its 40th anniversary, on 1 July 2022, with a special broadcast it featured guest appearances from former hosts Steve Liebmann, Sue Kellaway, Tracy Grimshaw, Lisa Wilkinson and Georgie Gardner.

The team revisited four decades of major news events, celebrity guests, road shows around Australia and the world and wild viral moments. A dedicated highlights show, Today 40th Anniversary Special aired on 2 July which featured highlights from the special broadcast.

Format
Today, an offshoot of Nine News, predominantly presents news, sport, weather, entertainment and current affairs, focusing on the first news of the day. However the show also features topics including consumer affairs, health, politics, education, fashion, and the business and finance world. The show has daily feedback and topic segments for viewers to send in their thoughts and opinions via email, text messages and the show's website.

Initially, the program was only a two-hour broadcast, airing from 7:00 am to 9:00 am. After dropping Nine Early Morning News, the network moved Today to a 6:00 am start. Again, as part of the 2008–2009 Nine News brand's major expansion, in 2008 the show was changed to a three and a half-hour format, starting at 5.30 am to now "perfect match" breakfast radio stations. This move included an extended news, sport, finance and weather segment prior to the main program at 6:00 am. Weekend Today airs on both Saturday and Sunday from 7:00 am to 10:00 am.

Hosts

Previous anchors 
The main presenters of Today have included:

{| class="wikitable plainrowheaders"
|-
! Tenure
! colspan="2" scope="col" |Presenters
|-
! scope="row" |1982–1985
| rowspan="3" |Steve Liebmann
| Sue Kellaway
|-
! scope="row" |1986
| Patrice Newell
|-
! scope="row" |1986–1987
| rowspan="3" |Liz Hayes
|-
! scope="row" |1987–1990
| George Negus
|-
! scope="row" |1990–1996
| rowspan="2" |Steve Liebmann
|-
! scope="row" |1996–2005
| rowspan="2" |Tracy Grimshaw
|-
! scope="row" |2005
| rowspan="4|Karl Stefanovic
|-
! scope="row" |2006
| Jessica Rowe
|-
! scope="row" |2007–2017
| Lisa Wilkinson
|-
! scope="row" |2018
| rowspan="2" |Georgie Gardner
|-
! scope="row" |2019
| Deborah Knight
|-
! scope="row" |2020–2022
| rowspan=2 |Karl Stefanovic
| Allison Langdon
|-
! scope="row" |2023–present
| Sarah Abo
|}

 Reporters 

 Fill-in presenters 

Current presenters who have been fill-in hosts or co-hosts of Today in recent times include Alex Cullen, Richard Wilkins, Jayne Azzopardi, Leila McKinnon, Tom Steinfort, David Campbell, Sylvia Jeffreys, Charles Croucher, Lara Vella, Tracy Vo, Christine Ahern, Michael Genovese, Sophie Walsh, Belinda Russell, Amelia Adams and Brooke Boney.

Previous substitute presenters have included Ben Fordham, Cameron Williams, Kellie Sloane, Tim McMillan, Clint Stanaway, Sarah Murdoch, Sharyn Ghidella, Kim Watkins, Helen Dalley, Deborah Knight, Ellen Fanning, Ali Moore, Michael Pascoe, Peter FitzSimons, Peter Overton, Ross Greenwood, Michael Usher, Ken Sutcliffe, Mark Ferguson, Jennifer Keyte, Garry Lyon, Rebecca Maddern, Eddie McGuire and even Clive James on one occasion while the show was broadcasting from London. The former Premier of Victoria, Joan Kirner, presented the show on one occasion.

 News 
The idea of providing the latest news has been critical to the function of the program. Under the current format, seven main bulletins are delivered, once every half-hour. Today Perth news presenters:
 Tim McMillan (2014–2015)
 Tracy Vo (2016–2017)
 Louise Momber (2018–2019)
 Michael Genovese (2020)

During 2007, Kellie Sloane and Allison Langdon filled in for Georgie Gardner who was on maternity leave.

In July 2009, Georgie Gardner was appointed Nine News Sydney presenter on Friday and Saturday nights, she juggled her commitments with Today and presented the news from Tuesday to Friday. The Weekend Today news presenter would present the news on Monday. These news presenters have included Amber Sherlock (2009–2010), Alicia Loxley (2010–2011) and Deborah Knight (2011–2014).

In 2014, Sylvia Jeffreys was appointed news presenter on Today replacing Gardner. Given that Sylvia would not be required to balance her role with any additional roles within the network, she was able to commit to the program five days per week, meaning the specialised Monday morning news presenting role was no longer needed. In December 2018, it was announced that Jeffreys would not return to Today in 2019 and move onto other projects.

In January 2019, Tom Steinfort was announced as Jeffrey's replacement. In December 2019, it was announced, Nine Live Perth news presenter, Tracy Vo would be the news presenter with Steinfort returning to 60 Minutes.

In March 2020, Vo permanently returned to Perth due to the COVID-19 pandemic. Alex Cullen now presents both news and sport.Today Perth local news inserts were introduced in March 2014, but were axed in May 2020.

In January 2023, Brooke Boney replaced Alex Cullen as news presenter with Cullen focusing on sport. 

Lara Vella, Tim Davies  Jayne Azzopardi are the main substitute news presenters.

Jayne Azzopardi, Mark Burrows, Brooke Boney, Brett McLeod, Charles Croucher, Mia Glover, Amelia Adams, Gabrielle Boyle, Amber Sherlock, Wendy Kingston, Kim Watkins, Ben Fordham, Peter Stefanovic, Vicky Jardim, Majella Wiemers, Helen Kapalos, Heather Foord, Peter Overton, Lizzie Pearl, Aislin Kriukelis, Allison Langdon, Andrew Lofthouse, Peter Hitchener, Mark Ferguson and Michael Thomson have all among others presented the news on occasions.

 Finance 
Brooke Boney currently presents the finance news after presenting the news.

Each morning at 7:55am, Effie Zahos presents a 'Your Money' finance segment based around consumer insights and information.

 Sport 
Alex Cullen currently presents sports news after the news bulletin every half-hour. In 2006, Cameron Williams was appointed as the inaugural sports presenter previously the news presenter would present sport headlines. Williams presented sport from 2006 until 2010, leaving the role to focus on co-hosting Weekend Today and Nine News. Ben Fordham presented sport from 2011 until 2014. He left to focus on his family and 2GB radio show. In January 2019, Tony Jones was announced as Gilbert's replacement. Jones remained in the position until he was replaced in November 2019. In December 2019, it was announced that Alex Cullen will replace Tony Jones as sport presenter permanently from January 2020.

 Weather 
Tim Davies currently presents the weather after each news and sport bulletin, every half-hour. During the COVID-19 pandemic, Davies spent weeks touring Queensland for his weather reports, as it was relatively free of the virus. 
 
Scherri-Lee Biggs and Lara Vella are substitute weather presenters.

Alex Heinke, Abby Coleman, Aislin Kriukelis, Julie Snook, Rose Jacobs, Emma Freedman, Amelia Adams, Sylvia Jeffreys, Scherri-Lee Biggs, Giaan Rooney, Gorgi Coghlan, Izabella Staskowski, Dave Kirwan, Jaynie Seal, Dan Anstey, Livinia Nixon, Carolyne Randoe and Majella Wiemers have all presented the weather on various occasions.

 Entertainment Today's entertainment presenter, Richard Wilkins (Nine Network's entertainment editor), presents daily features, interviews, movie and television reviews from across the world of show business. In December 2018, it was announced that Brooke Boney would join Today as an entertainment reporter and will work alongside Wilkins. In December 2019, it was announced that Boney would remain as entertainment reporter with Richard Wilkins moving across to co-host Weekend Today Richard Wilkins and Renee Bargh are substitute entertainment presenters.

 Technology 
Technology commentator Trevor Long appears regularly with news related to technology, as well as presenting segments explaining technology or new gadgets. During the 2020 pandemic, his segments were primarily presented from his own studio at EFTM.

 Traffic 

Traffic reports are shown at regular intervals during the show, and are presented in some cities from a local helicopter. Traffic reports only air into the metropolitan regions of Sydney, Melbourne and Brisbane. They are produced and presented by traffic reporters from the Australian Traffic Network.

 Ratings 

From 2004 to 2007, Sunrise won the ratings battle, defeating Today by 62% between January and May 2007. However, during 2007, Today slightly improved its ratings and made audience gains, and made a 9% rise from 2006 between 7am and 9am, and a 16% increase in the key 6am to 7am news hour. In contrast, Sunrise fell 4% year-on-year in the 7am to 9am timeslot. Since Lisa Wilkinson joined Today in May 2007, the program consistently defeated Sunrise in Melbourne.

On Good Friday 2009, Today defeated Sunrise for the first time in five years. Over the next four years, Today continued to make inroads on Sunrise, defeating them for a weekly win in June 2011 for the first time in seven years, and winning Sydney in 2012. However, upon Samantha Armytage's appointment as host of Sunrise in August 2013, Today's rating slipped for the next two years.

After some sizeable wins in the second half of 2015, Today managed some of its best ever ratings in early 2016. Today defeated Sunrise in 2016 based on weeks won.

After Sunrise reclaimed the ratings crown in 2017, the program's ratings slipped significantly in 2018, due to negative headlines surrounding co-host Karl Stefanovic. After Stefanovic was axed at the end of that year, the ratings for Today slipped even further in 2019, often posing record low ratings. The ratings trouble continued upon Stefanovic's return in 2020 with Today regularly beaten by both Sunrise and News Breakfast, although gradually the viewership gap has been reduced overtime. In mid-September 2021, Today recorded first instance of leading viewership over Sunrise since 2018.

Broadcasting
Due to the fact that Australia has more than one time zone, Today is not broadcast live to the entire nation.

New South Wales (including ACT), Victoria and Tasmania have Today aired live all year round.

During daylight saving time, Queensland receives Today delayed by one hour. However, in 2007, Today began a trial and aired live into Queensland between 5:00 – 8.30am, with an extra Queensland-only half-hour. This was unsuccessful, and in 2008 the show returned to its previous delayed telecast.

Additionally, the Northern Territory has Today delayed thirty minutes during winter and one-and-a-half hours during daylight saving time.

Some parts of South Australia are also delayed by thirty minutes, and in Western Australia, the program is delayed by two hours during winter and three hours during daylight saving time.

In the case of major breaking news (e.g. cyclone), the program goes live into the state to help provide residents with up-to-date information.

Other national and international broadcasts

WIN Television, which services most of regional Australia as a Nine Network affiliate through their stations, WIN in Southern New South Wales, VTV in Victoria, RTQ in regional Queensland, TVT in Tasmania, WOW in regional & remote Western Australia, AMN in Griffith, SDS/RDS in eastern South Australia and STV in Mildura, Imparja Television (callsign IMP), the only remote Nine affiliate station, and Southern Cross Austereo's Nine Network affiliated station in Broken Hill and the Spencer Gulf, GDS/BDN currently air Today across regional Australia as well as Nine-owned regional stations, NTD in Darwin and NBN in Northern New South Wales. Former carriers of Today across regional Australia, include: Southern Cross Nine, in Southern New South Wales and in the ACT through CTC, in Victoria through GLV/BCV and in Queensland through TNQ, Tasmanian Digital Television, in Tasmania, Mildura Digital Television in Mildura and West Digital Television in regional Western Australia. All former carriers of Today in regional Australia had switched to a Network 10 affiliation on 1 July 2021. 

In addition to Australia, Today is broadcast in Papua New Guinea on EMTV, and in Fiji on Fiji Television.

International connections
Even though the name of the show is the same as America's NBC Today Show, it has no link to its American namesake; in fact, due to affiliate agreements, Nine formerly aired ABC's Good Morning America, one of the American program's chief competitors, between 4.00 and 5.00am, until June 2018 when the Nine Network declined to renew its contract. It is now airing infomercials in its place.Affiliate Agreements – Transdiffusion, 7 November 2007 Todays rival on the Seven Network, Sunrise, follows the American NBC Today Show format, including a streetside studio. The Seven Network airs a condensed version of the American programme between 4.00 and 5.00am, preceding Sunrise, which is titled NBC Today'' in program listings to avert confusion.

See also

 List of Australian television series
 List of programs broadcast by Nine Network
 List of longest-running Australian television series

References

External links
 

Australian television news shows
1982 Australian television series debuts
1990s Australian television series
2000s Australian television series
2010s Australian television series
English-language television shows
Television shows set in Sydney
Breakfast television in Australia